Gekko scientiadventura is a species of gecko. It is endemic to Vietnam.

References

Gekko
Reptiles described in 2004
Endemic fauna of Vietnam
Reptiles of Vietnam